"Thriller Villa" is a name given to the former home of singer Michael Jackson, located in Las Vegas, Nevada close to the strip. The Spanish Mediterranean-style house has four bedrooms, nine bathrooms and covers 27,000 square feet. It was built in 1952 by theater developer Horst Schmidt. Jackson lived there from 2007 until his death in 2009. In 2022, the home was listed for sale for a asking price of $9.5 million.

In late 2006, Michael returned to the United States after living in Western Asia for nearly a year.  He lived there with his 3 children. He moved to Vegas in attempt to negotiate a contract for a residency on the strip.  The master bedroom included a sitting area and a mini-bar with a bathroom. The home also included a bar, a two-story chapel, courtyard, as well as a 2,000 square foot guest house. The home is now used for private events and gatherings.

References
	
	

Houses in Clark County, Nevada
Michael Jackson
Houses completed in 1952